Woman of Rome is a 1954 drama film directed by Luigi Zampa, and starring Gina Lollobrigida.

Plot
Beautiful but poor Adriana, during the fascist era, finds work as a model for a painter. She becomes the lover of a chauffeur who promises to marry her, but then is revealed to be already married. She improvises herself as a prostitute and then falls in love with Mino, a good guy who ends up in jail for anti-fascist activities. Thus Adriana's misadventures in search of love continue.

Cast
 Gina Lollobrigida as Adriana
 Daniel Gélin as Mino
 Franco Fabrizi as Gino
 Raymond Pellegrin as Astarita
 Pina Piovani as Madre di Adriana
 Xenia Valderi as Gisella
 Renato Tontini as Carlo Sonzogno
 Gino Buzzanca as Riccardo
 Mariano Bottino as Tommaso
 Giuseppe Addobbati as Tullio
 Giovanni Di Benedetto as Il pittore (as Gianni Di Benedetto)
 Riccardo Garrone as Giancarlo

References

External links

1954 films
1954 drama films
1950s Italian-language films
Italian drama films
Italian black-and-white films
Films set in Rome
Films shot in Rome
Films directed by Luigi Zampa
Films based on Italian novels
Films based on works by Alberto Moravia
1950s Italian films